Marcantonio Mario Dimitri dei Principi Ruspoli (November 28, 1926 – August 1, 2003) was the 3rd Principe di Poggio Suasa and Prince of the Holy Roman Empire, son of Costantino Ruspoli (Costantino is an eldest son of Mario Ruspoli, 2nd Prince of Poggio Suasa), and wife Elisabeth Catherine Adrienne Marie Anne Comtesse van der Noot d'Assche.

Marriages and children 
He married firstly at Recife, Pernambuco, November 17, 1951 and divorced in 1958 Lúcia Helena Pessoa de Mello (April 22, 1922 –), a Portuguese Brazilian, without issue.

He married secondly at Maceió, Alagoas, September 8, 1981 Gleide Chagas Portela (Catende, Pernambuco, November 18, 1935 – Recife, Pernambuco, July 3, 1992), a Portuguese Brazilian, daughter of Pedro Chagas and wife Natália Portela, by whom he had six children:

 Donna Adriana dei Principi Ruspoli-Poggio Suasa (Recife, Pernambuco, February 27, 1963 –), unmarried and without issue.
 Donna Elizabeth dei Principi Ruspoli-Poggio Suasa (Recife, Pernambuco, January 17, 1965 –), married at Recife, Pernambuco, December 2, 1990 Natanael Gonçalves, by whom she had an only daughter:
 Nataly  Gonçalves (São Paulo, São Paulo, September 2, 1994 –).
 Donna Christiane dei Principi Ruspoli-Poggio Suasa (Recife, Pernambuco, January 25, 1968 –), married on March 31, 1990 José Portella de Macedo, Jr., by whom she had an only son:
 José Eduardo  Portella de Macedo (Manaus, Amazonas, March 17, 1991 –) He married on January 09, 2021 Allany Carvalho de Melo.
 Costantino Mario Ruspoli, 4th Prince of Poggio Suasa.
Donna Diana dei Principi Ruspoli-Poggio Suasa (Recife, Pernambuco, March 5, 1973 –), married in Recife, Pernambuco, June 2, 2002 Fábio Miguel Santos, by whom she had an only son:
 Fábio Henrique Miguel Santos (Recife, Pernambuco, 2005 –).
 Don Pietro Marco dei Principi Ruspoli-Poggio Suasa (Maceió, Alagoas, March 25, 1981 – Maceió, Alagoas, March 28, 1981).

See also 
 Ruspoli

External links 
 Marcantonio Mario Dimitri Ruspoli on a genealogical site

1926 births
2003 deaths
Mercantonio
Italian nobility